The 2022 Michigan Wolverines baseball team represented the University of Michigan in the 2022 NCAA Division I baseball season. The Wolverines, led by head coach Erik Bakich in his tenth season, are a member of the Big Ten Conference and played their home games at Wilpon Baseball Complex in Ann Arbor, Michigan. The Wolverines won the 2022 Big Ten baseball tournament and qualified for the NCAA Tournament.

Previous season
The Wolverines finished the 2021 season 27–19, including 27–17 in conference play, finishing in third place in their conference. Following the conclusion of the regular season, the Wolverines received an at-large bid to the 2021 NCAA Division I baseball tournament, where they lost to UConn and Central Michigan in the NCAA Regional.

Preseason
For the 2022 Big Ten Conference poll, Michigan was voted to finish in second by the Big Ten Coaches.

Michigan was ranked No. 30 in the preseason poll by Collegiate Baseball.

Roster

Schedule and results
{| class="toccolours" width=95% style="clear:both; margin:1.5em auto; text-align:center;"
|-
! colspan=2 style="" | 2022 Michigan Wolverines Baseball Game Log
|-
! colspan=2 style="" | Regular Season (28–25)
|- valign="top"
|

|-
|

|-
|

|-
|

|-
! colspan=2 style="" | Postseason (5–3)
|-
|

|-
|

|-
|- style="text-align:center;"
|   

Notes:
  The March 11 game at Louisville was suspended due to snow in the top of the fifth inning with the score 13–4 in favor of the Wolverines. It was completed on March 13 prior to the regularly scheduled game that afternoon.

Rankings

Awards and honors

Major League Baseball Draft
The following Wolverines were selected in the 2022 Major League Baseball draft:

References

Michigan
Michigan
Big Ten Conference baseball champion seasons
Michigan Wolverines baseball seasons
Michigan